Harshir may refer to:

Harshir-e Imani